The following is the Bulgarian order of battle at the beginning of the second phase of the First Balkan War as of January 21, 1913.  This order of battle includes all combat units, including engineer and artillery units, but not medical, supply, signal and border guard units.

Background
For almost a month the talks at St. James's Palace achieved very little when on   the Young Turks, led by Enver Bey staged a coup and seized power in Constantinople. The new government was determined to hold on to Adrianople at all costs, a position which Bulgaria viewed as unacceptable and led to the denouncement of the armistice on 16 of January 1913. With the initiative in their hands and with a renewed sense of confidence in their war leaders and in their ability to successfully fight the Bulgarians, the Ottomans decided to execute an offensive plan that was devised in mid December 1912. Leaving their small remaining forces in Epirus and Albania on their own the Ottomans focused entirely on the Thracian Theater where they planned a full-scale, corps level, amphibious invasion on the western shore of the Sea of Marmara was to be attempted with simultaneous attacks by the provisional corps on the Gallipoli Peninsula and the Çatalca Army, while the Adrianople garrison and conducted diversionary attacks.

Bulgarian preparations
During the armistice the Bulgarians took several important measures to improve their strategic and tactical situation in Thrace.  As early as December 1912 they realized that the rear of their Second Army at Adrianople or of their First and Third Armies could have easily been threatened by a large Ottoman offensive using the Gallipoli Peninsula as its staging point. To counter this threat the Bulgarian high command decided to transfer all its forces that were previously fighting on the Western Theater as they had fulfilled their objectives there and on 15 of December 1912 formed the new Fourth Army. It was a powerful force of 93,389 men under the command of Major General Stiliyan Kovachev. Meanwhile at Adrianople the formation of a new 11th Infantry Division and the arrival of two Serbian infantry divisions allowed the Bulgarians to divert additional forces to support the armies on the Chataldzha line. In general the Bulgarians had the capture of Adrianople as their priority while the remaining three field armies of some 284,121 men were to assume a defensive stance and repel the Ottoman offensive.

Chataldzha Line
First Army was commanded by Lieutenant-General Vasil Kutinchev, who was also appointed commander of the combined First and Third armies.

 1st Sofia Infantry Division ( Major-General Toshev)
 1st Brigade
 1st "Sofia" Infantry Regiment
 6th "Turnovo" Infantry Regiment
 2nd Brigade
 37th Infantry Regiment
 38th Infantry Regiment
4th QF FAR
4th FAR
1st Pioneer Battalion
 3rd Balkan Infantry Division ( Major-General Sarafov)
 1st Brigade
 11th "Sliven" Infantry Regiment
 24th "Black Sea" Infantry Regiment
 2nd Brigade
 29th "Yambol" Infantry Regiment
 32nd "Zagora" Infantry Regiment
 3rd Brigade
 41st Infantry Regiment
 42nd Infantry Regiment
6th QF FAR
6th FAR
3rd Pioneer Battalion
 6th Bdin Infantry Division ( Major-General Tenev)
 1st Brigade
 3rd "Bdin" Infantry Regiment
 15th "Lom" Infantry Regiment
 2nd Brigade
 35th "Vratsa" Infantry Regiment
 36th "Kozloduy" Infantry Regiment
2nd QF FAR
6th Pioneer Battalion
 10th Infantry Division ( Major-General Bradistilov)
 1st Brigade
 16th "Lovech" Infantry Regiment
 25th "Dragoman" Infantry Regiment
 2nd Brigade
 47th Infantry Regiment
 48th Infantry Regiment
10th FAR
10th Pioneer Battalion

Third Army was commanded by Lieutenant-General Radko Dimitriev.

 4th Preslav Infantry Division ( Major-General Boyadzhiev)
 1st Brigade
 7th "Preslav" Infantry Regiment
 19th "Shumen" Infantry Regiment
 2nd Brigade
 8th "Primorski" Infantry Regiment
 31st "Varna" Infantry Regiment
 3rd Brigade
 43rd Infantry Regiment
 44th Infantry Regiment
5th QF FAR
5th FAR
5th Pioneer Battalion
 5th Danube Infantry Division ( Major-General Hristov)
 1st Brigade
 2nd "Iskar" Infantry Regiment
 5th "Danube" Infantry Regiment
 2nd Brigade
 18th "Etarski" Infantry Regiment
 20th "Dobruja" Infantry Regiment
 3rd Brigade
 45th Infantry Regiment
 46th "Troyan" Infantry Regiment
1st QF FAR
1st FAR
5th Pioneer Battalion
 9th Pleven Infantry Division ( Major-General Sirakov)
 1st Brigade
 4th "Pleven" Infantry Regiment
 17th "Dorostol" Infantry Regiment
 2nd Brigade
 33rd "Svishtov" Infantry Regiment
 34th "Troyan" Infantry Regiment
9th QF FAR
9th Pioneer Battalion

Gallipoli Peninsula
Fourth Army was commanded by Major-General Stiliyan Kovachev.

 2nd Thracian Infantry Division ( Colonel Geshov)
 1st Brigade
 9th "Plovdiv" Infantry Regiment
 21st "Srednogorian" Infantry Regiment
 3rd Brigade
 27th "Chepinski" Infantry Regiment
 39th  Infantry Regiment
3rd QF FAR
3rd MAR**
2nd Pioneer Battalion
 7th Rila Infantry Division ( Major-General Todorov)
 1st Brigade
 13th "Rila" Infantry Regiment
 28th "Pernik" Infantry Regiment
 22nd "Thracian" Infantry Regiment
 2nd Brigade
 14th "Macedonian" Infantry Regiment
 3rd Brigade
 49th Infantry Regiment
 50th Infantry Regiment
7th QF FAR
7th FAR
2nd MAR
5th Cavalry Regiment
7th Pioneer Battalion
Cavalry Division ( Major-General Nazlamov)
 1st Brigade
 2nd Cavalry Regiment
 4th Cavalry Regiment
 7th Cavalry Regiment
 Mixed Cavalry Brigade
 1st Cavalry Regiment
 3rd Cavalry Regiment
 6th Cavalry Regiment
2/2 Infantry Brigade
 28th "Stremski" Infantry Regiment
 40th Infantry Regiment
2/3 QF FAR Section
1/3 QF Howitzer Battery
 Macedonian-Adrianopolitan Volunteer Corps ( Major-General Genev)
 1st Brigade
 1st "Debar" Infantry Battalion
 2nd "Skopie" Infantry Battalion
 3rd "Solun" Infantry Battalion
 4th "Bitolia" Infantry Battalion
 2nd Brigade
 5th "Odrin" Infantry Battalion
 6th "Ohrid" Infantry Battalion
 7th "Kumanovo" Infantry Battalion
 8th "Kostur" Infantry Battalion
 3rd Brigade
 9th "Veles" Infantry Battalion
 10th "Prilep" Infantry Battalion
 11th "Serres" Infantry Battalion
 12th "Lozengrad" Infantry Battalion
2/2 QF FAR Section
4/4 MAR Section

Adrianople

Second Army was commanded by lieutenant-general Nikola Ivanov.

 8th Tundzha Infantry Division ( Major-General Kirkov)
 1st Brigade
 12th "Balkan" Infantry Regiment
 23rd "Shipka" Infantry Regiment
 2nd Brigade
 10th "Rhodope" Infantry Regiment
 30th "Sheinovo" Infantry Regiment
 3rd Brigade
 51st Infantry Regiment
 52nd Infantry Regiment
8th QF FAR
8th FAR
8th Pioneer Battalion
 11th Infantry Division ( Major-General Velchev)
 1st Brigade
 55th Infantry Regiment
 56th Infantry Regiment
 2nd Brigade
 57th Infantry Regiment
 58th Infantry Regiment
11th FAR
3/9 Infantry Brigade (Major-General Grancharov)
53rd Infantry Regiment
54th Infantry Regiment
2/9 QF FAR Section
 Second Serbian Army was commanded by General Stepa Stepanović.
 Timok Division I Line
 Danube Division II Line

Notes
Footnotes

Citations

References

External links
Orders of Battle

First Balkan War
Military history of Bulgaria
Balkan Wars orders of battle